"Sista Sista" was the third single release from British soul singer Beverley Knight's Prodigal Sista album. Knight has previously described the song as the highlight of her career as a lyricist, and is dedicated to two of her friends - "Melissa and Karen", according to the album sleeve. The song was released in November 1998 but it failed to chart in Britain.

Track list
CD 1

"Sista Sista"
"The Need Of You" (Live From Radio 1's Smokin' Room Session)
"Do Right Woman, Do Right Man" (Live From Radio 1's Smokin' Room Session)
"Sista Sista" (Full Crew Main Mix)

CD 2

"Sista Sista" (Original Mix Edit)  	
"Sista Sista" (Full Crew Main Mix)	
"Sista Sista" (Definition Of Sound Dancehall Mix) 	
"Sista Sista" (Linslee Mix)
"Flavour of the Old School"

Music video
The music video for the original release of "Sista Sista" sees Knight performing alone, with a microphone in front of a red curtain. Directed by 'The New Renaissance' - a previous moniker for directing duo Harvey & Carolyn.

Sista Sista 99 (re-release)
"Sista Sista" was re-released as a single in 1999 and was the sixth and final single from Prodigal Sista. Together with a new video, the song charted at #31 in the UK. The release was designed to capitalise on Knight's success at the 1999 MOBO Awards, where she won two awards for Best R&B Act and Best Album for Prodigal Sista.

Track list
CD 1
"Sista Sista (radio edit)
"Sista Sista (Remixed by Capital T for SAS)
"Sista Sista (R&B Club Remix by SAS)

CD 2
"Sista Sista" (radio edit)
"Sista Sista" (Curtis and Moore Dub)
"Sista Sista" (Curtis and Moore Vocal mix)

Music video
The second video for "Sista Sista" sees Knight performing the song in a smokey bar, with her band.

Charts

Personnel
Written by Beverley Knight, Hawk Wolinski and Rod Gammons
Lyrics written by Beverley Knight
Melody created by Beverley Knight
Produced by Hawk Wolinski and Rod Gammons
Additional production provided by Definition of Sound
All vocals performed and arranged by Beverley Knight

See also
Beverley Knight discography

1998 singles
1999 singles
Beverley Knight songs
Songs written by Beverley Knight
Songs written by Hawk Wolinski
1998 songs
Parlophone singles